Orlovka may refer to:

 Orlovka (air base), in Amur Oblast, Russia
 Orlovka, Kyrgyzstan, a town in Chuy Region, Kyrgyzstan
 settlements in Russia:
 Orlovka, Altai Krai
 Orlovka, Arkharinsky District, Amur Oblast
 Orlovka, Konstantinovsky District, Amur Oblast
 Orlovka, Alsheyevsky District, Republic of Bashkortostan
 Orlovka, Arkhangelsky District, Bashkortostan
 Orlovka, Bakalinsky District, Republic of Bashkortostan
 Orlovka, Belebeyevsky District, Republic of Bashkortostan
 Orlovka, Blagoveshchensky District, Republic of Bashkortostan
 Orlovka, Fyodorovsky District, Republic of Bashkortostan
 Orlovka, Iglinsky District, Republic of Bashkortostan
 Orlovka, Karmaskalinsky District, Republic of Bashkortostan
 Orlovka, Uchalinsky District, Republic of Bashkortostan
 Orlovka, Yanaulsky District, Republic of Bashkortostan
 Orlovka, Vladimir Oblast
 Orlovka (station), Volgograd Oblast
 Krasnaya Orlovka, Amur Oblast
 Mokraya Orlovka, Belgorod Oblast
 rivers in Russia:
 Orlovka (Bolshoy Anyuy), a tributary of the Bolshoy Anyuy in Chukotka
 Orlovka (Ket), a tributary of the Ket in Tomsk Oblast
 Orlovka (Mamyn), a tributary of the Selemzha in Amur Oblast